Warrick Generating Station is a 755-MWe coal-fired electricity-generating station, located southeast of Newburgh in Warrick County. The plant has four coal-fired, steam-powered turbines with a combined generating capacity of 791 MWe. Alcoa owns three of the four generating stations, which were placed into service in the early 1960s. The largest unit, known as Unit 4, is 323-MWe unit jointly owned by Alcoa and Vectren. This larger unit was placed in operation in 1970.

Fuel
The Power Plant is generally fueled by Illinois Basin coal that is mined from the nearby region. The generating station receives about 2 million tons of coal each year from both rail and truck shipments.

Environmental impact
Warrick Plant discharges all of its waste heat (about twice its electrical output) into Ohio River. In 2006, Warrick Plant was the third most-polluting major power station in the US in terms of sulphur dioxide gas emission rate: it discharged  of SO2 for each MWh of electric power produced that year (92,919 tons of SO2 per year in total).

In light of the high emissions and increasing regulation, Alcoa commenced a large scale $400 million environmental investment to improve emission levels. In December 2008, the project was complete and included wet-flue gas desulphurization equipment (also known as scrubbers). This control equipment significantly reduced sulfur dioxide emissions beyond those required by regulation. Vectren also contributed to the upgrades on its share of Unit 4.

The environmental control system also included gypsum dewatering and handling facilities, dry-ash handling, new coal handling equipment and improved control facilities. With the control systems fully operational and online in 2009, the plant saw more than a 95 percent reduction in sulfur dioxide emissions and other compounds.

See also

 List of power stations in Indiana
 Global warming

References

External links
 http://www.vectren.com/web/eenablement/learn_about/environmental_stewardship/air_quality_i.jsp
 Barges hauling coal up the Ohio River with the F. B. Culley and Warrick Power Stations in the background

Energy infrastructure completed in 1960
Energy infrastructure completed in 1964
Energy infrastructure completed in 1965
Energy infrastructure completed in 1970
Coal-fired power stations in Indiana
Buildings and structures in Warrick County, Indiana
Alcoa